Waleed Siraj (born 27 October 1992) is a Sudanese professional footballer who plays as a defender for Hatta and the Sudan national football team.

References

External links
 

Living people
1992 births
Sudanese footballers
Sudanese expatriate footballers
Al-Merrikh SC players
Al-Ittihad Kalba SC players
Al Ain FC players
Hatta Club players
Khor Fakkan Sports Club players
UAE Pro League players
UAE First Division League players
Expatriate footballers in the United Arab Emirates
Association football defenders